= Chatsworth Estate =

The Chatsworth Estate may refer to:

- Chatsworth House and the surrounding lands in Derbyshire, England
- The Chatsworth Estate, the fictional setting of the C4 show, Shameless
